Hamza Bencherif (born 9 February 1988) is a professional footballer who plays as a defender or midfielder for Northern Premier League club Worksop Town where he is club captain. Born in Paris, he has played in the Football League for several clubs and represented Algeria at youth international level.

Club career
Bencherif was born in Paris and started his career with Guingamp before joining Nottingham Forest's youth system in August 2006. He joined League Two club Lincoln City on 2 October 2007 on a one-month loan, which was extended for a second month. He made 12 appearances and scored 1 goal against Chesterfield. He was released by Forest at the end of the 2008–09 season and signed a one-year contract with League Two club Macclesfield Town on 6 July 2009. He became a first-team regular in the first half of the season at Moss Rose, but a broken ankle he sustained in December 2009 ended his season. Bencherif signed a one-year extension to his contract in May 2010, and scored 11 goals in 46 appearances in 2010–11.

He rejected a new contract offer from Macclesfield to sign a two-year contract with League One club Notts County on 23 June 2011. He was released when his contract expired in the summer of 2013. Bencherif signed a short-term contract with League Two club Plymouth Argyle in September 2013, and scored on his debut the next day against Cheltenham Town. He was released in January 2014, having made nine appearances for the club, before signing for Algerian Ligue Professionnelle 1 club JS Kabylie on a one-and-a-half-year contract.

Bencherif joined Conference Premier club Lincoln City on 1 August 2014 on a one-year contract. After one season with Lincoln, he turned down a new contract to join National League club F.C. Halifax Town. He started as F.C. Halifax beat Grimsby Town 1–0 on 22 May 2016 at Wembley Stadium in the 2016 FA Trophy Final.

Bencherif signed for National League club Wrexham on 24 May 2016 on a one-year contract. On 17 January 2017, Bencherif joined Wrexham's National League rivals York City on loan until the end of 2016–17. On 21 May 2017, he started as York beat Macclesfield Town 3–2 at Wembley Stadium in the 2017 FA Trophy Final. Bencherif signed for York permanently on 16 June 2017 on a one-year contract. He was released at the end of the 2018–19 season.

Bencherif signed for National League North club Guiseley on 24 June 2019. On 9 January 2021 he was appointed Club Captain.

On 9 June 2022, Bencherif signed for Northern Premier League club Worksop Town.

International career
Bencherif made seven appearances, scoring one goal, for the Algeria national under-20 team from 2005 to 2006. A call-up to the senior team was talked about in 2009 due to his form at Macclesfield Town before a broken ankle ended his season.

Career statistics

Honours
F.C. Halifax Town
FA Trophy: 2015–16

York City
FA Trophy: 2016–17

References

External links

Profile at the Guiseley A.F.C. website

1988 births
Living people
Footballers from Paris
Algerian footballers
Algeria youth international footballers
French footballers
Association football defenders
Association football midfielders
En Avant Guingamp players
Nottingham Forest F.C. players
Lincoln City F.C. players
Macclesfield Town F.C. players
Notts County F.C. players
Plymouth Argyle F.C. players
JS Kabylie players
FC Halifax Town players
Wrexham A.F.C. players
York City F.C. players
Guiseley A.F.C. players
English Football League players
Algerian Ligue Professionnelle 1 players
National League (English football) players
Algerian expatriate footballers
French expatriate footballers
Expatriate footballers in England
Algerian expatriate sportspeople in England
French expatriate sportspeople in England
French sportspeople of Algerian descent